Pembroke Street is a street in central Oxford, England. St Ebbes Street is to the west and major thoroughfare of St Aldate's is to the east.

Modern Art Oxford (formerly the Museum of Modern Art) is located on the north side of the street (No 30). Greene's Tutorial College is at 45 Pembroke Street and All Nations Language School is at No 40.

Pembroke Square and Pembroke College are close by to the south.

In November 2009, it was announced that the planned Story Museum would move to premises at Rochester House in Pembroke Street, using a gift of £2.5m from a private donor.

References 

Streets in Oxford
Art gallery districts